Tenderfoot Pass is a mountain pass northeast of Cripple Creek that reaches a peak elevation of .

See also
Colorado mountain passes

External links
 Tenderfoot Pass

Mountain passes of Colorado
Landforms of Teller County, Colorado
Transportation in Teller County, Colorado